Xianghuang (Hobot Xar) Banner, historically also known as Bordered Yellow Banner (Mongolian:    Хөвөөт Шар хошуу Köbegetü Sir-a qosiɣu) is a banner of Inner Mongolia, China. It is under the administration of Xilin Gol League.

Climate

References

Further reading 
 
www.xzqh.org 

Banners of Inner Mongolia